Edeline Lee is a London-based, Canadian British fashion designer of Korean descent.

Early life and education 
Edeline Lee was born and raised in Vancouver, British Columbia, Canada and completed a Bachelor of Arts degree with First Class Joint Honors at McGill University.  She then completed her Foundation in Arts and Design at Central Saint Martins College of Art and Design and graduated with a First from Central Saint Martins with a BA (Honours) Fashion Design Womenswear.

Career 
In between her degrees, Edeline Lee apprenticed in the studios of Alexander McQueen in London and John Galliano in Paris.  She also trained at Conock & Lockie under the former Head Cutter of H. Huntsman & Sons of Savile Row in traditional methods of bespoke tailoring.  She dropped out of Central Saint Martins to work as an Assistant Designer to Zac Posen in New York.  She returned to Central Saint Martins to finish her degree and then worked as Head Designer for Rodnik in London.  She then consulted for various companies.

Label 
Lee was commissioned by jeweller Cora Sheibani to design a collection on which to display her jewellery. This accidental soft launch led to a flurry of private orders and the birth of her eponymous collection. It was discovered by Hamish Bowles, reviewed in Vogue and Women’s Wear Daily, written up by the New York Times and chosen as one of Harper’s Bazaar’s 10 Favorite Things and one of Vogue Italia’s Talents.  Her work has been covered extensively in the press since.

Edeline Lee has received strong support from the women of the art world, who naturally gravitate towards her aesthetically sophisticated signature of structured, feminine shapes, clean modernist lines, and precise attention to craftsmanship. She has gained international recognition for her fashion presentations which have the immersive quality of film and live performance.  Her work was  exhibited by the curators of the Fashion Space Gallery to represent the "Future of Fashion Presentation".

Edeline Lee has been a regular contributor to Style.com’s Video Fashion Week and Guest Editor for Stiletto Magazine. Edeline Lee was awarded a New Fashion Pioneer by the Centre for Fashion Enterprise and is twice a Finalist for the prestigious Samsung Fashion & Design Fund. In 2016, Edeline was nominated for Breakthrough Womenwear Designer of the Year by WGSN.  In 2017, Edeline was awarded a British Fashion Council Fashion Trust grant, and was a finalist for the Mercedes Benz Etoiles prize.  She has been showing on the official calendar of London Fashion Week since Spring Summer 2018. 

All Edeline Lee pieces are made by hand in England of fabrics woven in Italy, France and Austria.

Her work has been worn by HRH the Duchess of Cambridge Kate Middleton, Olivia Colman, Sally Hawkins, Gemma Chan, Phoebe Waller-Bridge, Helen Mirren, Cynthia Nixon, Alicia Vikander, Taylor Swift, Ciara, Amy Fine Collins, Ellie Goulding and Solange Knowles.

You can find her collections at the following stores: Harvey Nichols, Bloomingdales, Stanley Korshak, Moda Operandi, Browns, Fenwick, Harrods, Angela's, Jane Davidson, Club Designer, Gallery 9, So Susu and Costume Dublin.

References

External links 
Official website
Facebook
Instagram
WWD- Kate Middleton Fires Up the Internet With Edeline Lee’s Green Dress
Harpers Bazaar- My Life My Style: Edeline Lee
Edeline Lee AW19 at London Fashion Week
Edeline Lee SS22 Film at London Fashion Week

Living people
Canadian fashion designers
Canadian women fashion designers
McGill University alumni
Year of birth missing (living people)